Wild Dreams may refer to:

 Wild Dreams (Westlife album), 2021
 Wild Dreams (Joyce Yang album), 2014